Virginia's Husband is a 1934 British comedy film directed by Maclean Rogers and starring Dorothy Boyd, Reginald Gardiner and Enid Stamp-Taylor. The screenplay concerns a woman who enlists a man to pose as her husband to trick her aunt. The play by Florence Kilpatrick on which the film is based, had previously been adapted as a silent film in 1928.

Cast
 Dorothy Boyd - Virginia Trevor 
 Reginald Gardiner - John Craddock 
 Enid Stamp-Taylor - June Haslett 
 Ena Grossmith - Elizabeth 
 Annie Esmond - Mrs. Elkins 
 Sebastian Smith - Mr. Ritchie 
 Wally Patch - Police Sergeant 
 Tom Helmore - Barney Hammond 
 Andreas Malandrinos - Headwaiter 
 Hal Walters - Mechanic

Critical reception
In their review, TV Guide concluded the film had "Some amusing moments but not enough to sustain the comedy throughout."

References

External links
 

1934 films
1934 comedy films
British comedy films
Films directed by Maclean Rogers
British films based on plays
British black-and-white films
1930s English-language films
1930s British films